The Tribe is a 2014 novel by Australian author Michael Mohammed Ahmad, published by Giramondo.

Plot 
The novel focuses on the world of three generations of Lebanese Australians, as observed by young protagonist Bani.

Awards 
The Sydney Morning Herald Best Young Australian Novelists - 2015 - won

References 

2014 Australian novels
Novels set in Sydney
Lebanese Australian
Asian-Australian culture
Arab-Australian culture
Giramondo Publishing books